The first season of Canada's Got Talent, a reality television series, premiered on City in 2012. Unlike America's Got Talent, the show only had the audition round, Top 37, semi-finals and a finale. The premiere episode aired on March 4, 2012. It had a viewership of 2 million on average, throughout the night, which was a record for Citytv. The season ended on May 14, 2012.

The season was won by Sagkeeng's Finest, an indigenous dance troupe from Fort Alexander, Manitoba.

Format

Auditions 
The auditions took place in front of the judges, and a live audience, in different cities across Canada. At any time during the audition, the judges show their disapproval to the act by pressing a buzzer, which lights a large red "X" on the stage. If all the judges pressed their buzzers, the act must end. Voting worked on a majority-of-two basis, where two positive votes from the judges were required.

The Cutdown 
The acts accepted past the audition moved on to the Judges Round (also known as "The Cutdown"). This stage of the competition did not feature any audiences, and only contained contestants performing in front of the judges. Out of all that made it to this point, thirty-six acts made it through to the next round, which was the semi-finals.

Semi-finals 
The semi-finals and final were broadcast with a varying number of semi-finals, followed by the one final split into two episodes over one night. The remaining acts performed across a number of semi-finals, with the two most popular acts from each semi-final winning a position in the final. Judges could end a performance early with three X's. The judges were asked to express their views on each act's performance. Phone lines, Twitter, Facebook, texting and online voting platforms opened for a one-hour after all acts performed, while the public voted for the act they thought were the best. Voters could submit a total of fifty votes (ten in each platform). After the votes were counted, the act that polled the highest number of public votes automatically, was placed in the final. The judges then chose between the second and third most popular acts, with the winner of that vote also gaining a place in the final. All other acts were then eliminated from the competition.

Judges and hosts 
It was announced that Martin Short would be one of three judges this season on October 13, 2011. Four days later, Stephan Moccio and Measha Brueggergosman were confirmed to be the other two judges. The same day, Dina Pugliese, co-host of Breakfast Television, was announced as the host for the show.

Broadcasting 
Because of the various time zones in Canada, only viewers in the provinces and territories east of Manitoba saw the show live (in the Newfoundland, Atlantic and Eastern time zones). All other areas in Canada broadcast the show on a tape delay basis. All Citytv stations aired the show at 8:00 p.m. (in each time zone where there is a Citytv station) with the Toronto station airing the program at 8:00 p.m. Viewers in Newfoundland saw the show live at 9:30 p.m., and viewers in the Atlantic region at 9:00 p.m., because there is no Citytv station in these provinces to broadcast the show at local time. The same process occurred with the results show.

Season overview

Auditions

Preliminary auditions 
Canada's Got Talent traveled to six different cities across the country for the producer auditions: Winnipeg, Edmonton, Vancouver, Montreal, Toronto and Halifax, during the months of September and October 2011.

After the final auditions were completed in Halifax, the show then traveled to Calgary, Vancouver, Toronto, Winnipeg, Halifax and Montreal for the live-audience auditions (which were taped in October, November, December 2011 and January 2012).

A total of 244 acts were given a "yes" during the auditions. A total of 108 auditions were aired on television (both eliminated acts and successful acts).

Judges round 
The acts accepted past the audition round moved on to the Judges Round (also known as "The Cutdown"). This stage of the competition did not feature any audiences, and only contained contestants walking up to the judges or Dina (host) to find out if they made it to the next round. Originally, of the acts that made it to this point, thirty-six acts made it through to the next round which would be the semi-finals. However, because the judges "broke a rule", the final number of semi-finalists were thirty-seven. During the episode, it was announced that 244 acts were given a "yes" during the auditions, meaning 207 were eliminated (some of these auditions were not shown on television).

The judges could not decide between two similar acts. Scott Jackson and KRNFX (who were both beatboxers), were both called up to the judges and told that in order to determine who would make the live shows, they would have to beatbox right then. After both acts finished, the judges still could not decide, opting to have both of them advance.

Good for Grapes were initially semifinalists, but they had to drop out for personal reasons. Volodymyr Martynouk served as their replacement, but he suffered a fall shortly before the semifinals began, meaning he could not make it due to his recovery time.

Semi-finals 
At this point in the competition, the selected thirty-seven acts performed in front of an audience and the judges. The semi-finals contained six or seven acts per week for six weeks, with the day after being the results show. Each week, out of the acts that perform, only two made it to the finals. To determine who moved to the finals, home viewers selected one act, and the judges selected the other.

Caitlin Bell and Mathew Cathcart "The Emsee" were selected to join the competition from the Last Chance YouTube auditions.

Semi-finals summary 
 Buzzed Out |  Judges' choice | 
 |  |

Week 1 (April 2–3, 2012)

Week 2 (April 8–9, 2012)

Week 3 (April 15–16, 2012)

Week 4 (April 22–23, 2012)

Week 5 (April 29–30, 2012)

Week 6 (May 6–7, 2012)

Finals Summary 

Only 12 acts made it to this point in the competition. After all the acts performed in the two-hour special on May 13, 2012, Canada voted for their favourite, and the winner of Canada's Got Talent's first season was crowned on May 14, 2012, on the finale of the show. The winner received a brand-new Nissan GT-R, possibly a performance in Las Vegas, a spot on Citytv's 2013 New Year's Eve Bash and $100,000 in Canadian currency.

The youngest platinum-selling recording artist in history, Jackie Evancho, who was a finalist on Season 5 of America's Got Talent, sang the Sarah McLachlan song "Angel" as a guest artist on the season finale on May 14. Canadian rock band Hedley performed the song "Beautiful" from their album Storms.

 |

Production
On May 30, 2011, Citytv and Insight Production announced that they would create a Canadian series of the hit Got Talent series and that the show would begin in spring 2012.

Revival
In June 2012, Rogers Media president, Scott Moore, announced that a second season would not be produced, after a "careful consideration of all factors, including the current economic climate". However, on June 8, 2021, it was announced that the series would be revived, first announced to be returning in spring 2022. Production on the series took place in fall 2021 at Niagara Falls.

On December 31, 2021, it was announced that the revival would premiere in March 2022, with it later specified as March 22.

Ratings

References

2012 Canadian television seasons
1